The award-winning Site Selection magazine, published by Conway Data, Inc., is the official publication of the Industrial Asset Management Council (IAMC). The magazine delivers expansion planning information to over 44,000 readers including corporate executives, site selection consultants, and real estate professionals. Site Selection is available in a bimonthly print magazine, or on their web site. The magazine is headquartered in Norcross, Georgia.

Staff 
Publication staff includes Adam Jones-Kelley, President; Sean Laughlin, Chief Operating Officer; Ron Starner, Senior Vice President; Mark Arend, Editor-in-Chief; Adam Bruns, Managing Editor; Gary Daughters, Senior Editor

History 
Site Selection dates back to 1883, with the Manufacturers Record of Baltimore. It was the top business journal of its day, with information about new plants and business expansions well into the 20th century. 
During the 1950s, McKinley Conway  purchased Manufacturers Record from the founder and merged it with his Industrial Development and Site Selection which subsequently became Site Selection.

Circulation 
Site Selection has an audited circulation of approx. 45,000 corporate decision-makers: 
• More than 44,000 c-suite manufacturing & corporate real estate executives;
• More than 2,500 government development agencies;
• Decision makers from more than 800 of the Fortune 1000 companies;
• More than 630 facility managers;
• More than 500 site consultants;
• Executives with more than 100 utilities;
• Representing more than 80 countries.

(Statistical information includes audited circulation and the publisher's own data.)

Awards 
Site Selection has received multiple awards from the Magazine Association of the Southeast (MAGS) including the MAGS GAMMA Gold Award for Best Business to Business Publication, MAGS GAMMA Gold Award for Best Magazine Website and the MAGS GAMMA Silver Award for Best Single Issue.

Site Selection has also received several Awards for Publication Excellence (APEX) in business communications, including the 2007 Apex Award of Excellence in the category of E-Mail Newsletters (SiteNet Dispatch) and the 2007 Apex Award of Excellence in the category of Magazines & Journals Over 32 pg.

References

External links
 Official website

Business magazines published in the United States
Bimonthly magazines published in the United States
Magazines established in 1883
Magazines published in Georgia (U.S. state)